The following table presents a listing of the states of Nigeria, and the dates of their creation.

References

Date of statehood